Fontanella is a municipality in the Austrian state of Vorarlberg.

Geography
About 29.5% of the municipality is forested, and 52.1% is alpine.

Subdivisions
The municipality consists of the villages Fontanella, Garlitt, Mittelberg, Türtsch, Kirchberg, Seewald and Faschina.

Economy
There are 18 companies. 102 persons are employed. In the tourism year 2001/2002 there were a total of 70,365 nights.

Population

History
Fontanella was founded by Walser settlers from Valais in the 14th century. It was occupied by France from 1945 to 1955.

References

Cities and towns in Bludenz District